Petar Pušić (born 25 January 1999) is a Swiss footballer who currently plays as a midfielder for Grasshopper Club Zürich in the Swiss Super League.

Club career
Pušić was born in the northern Swiss town of Schaffhausen, and played for local sides Sporting Club Schaffhausen and FC Schaffhausen, before making a move to top division side Grasshoppers in 2011. He signed his first professional contract in February 2017 alongside teammates Nedim Bajrami and Arijan Qollaku, and made his debut later the same month; coming on as a substitute for Mërgim Brahimi in a 3–0 loss to Lugano.

In the following two seasons, he saw a lot more play in the main squad, with over 50 appearances, including 26 starting lineups. Following their relegation in the 2018-19 season, he accompanied Grasshopper into the Swiss Challenge League. During the two years he spent in the second Swiss league, he established himself as a mainstay of the squad and was an instrumental part of Grasshoppers's promotion back to the Swiss Super League in 2021.

Despite strong interest of Super League giants FC Basel, he chose to renew his contract with Grasshoppers in October 2021, keeping him at the club until 2023. In December 2021, he contracted Covid-19, and continued suffering symptoms past the winter break. Due to the effects of Long COVID, he missed the remainder of the season, despite returning to training in March 2022. After seven months on the sideline, he returned to active play in time for the new season, coming on for the final 20 minutes in Grasshoppers' opening game against FC Lugano.

International career
Pušić was born in Switzerland and is of Croatian descent. He has represented Switzerland until the under-21 level. He played for the Switzerland U17 team in their unsuccessful European Under-17 Championship qualification bid in 2016, featuring in all three games of the elite round. He scored two goals for the under-17 side, both against Montenegro in 2015.

He played for the Swiss U21 squad between 2018 and 2021, making his first appearance against France in a friendly on 25 May 2018. He scored his only goal for the U21 squad against Georgia during the qualification for the 2021 U21 Euro.

Career statistics

Club

References

External links
 
 Under-16 Profile at football.ch
 Under-17 Profile at football.ch
 Under-18 Profile at football.ch

1999 births
Living people
Swiss men's footballers
Switzerland youth international footballers
Association football midfielders
Grasshopper Club Zürich players
Swiss Super League players
People from Schaffhausen
Sportspeople from the canton of Schaffhausen
Swiss people of Croatian descent
Switzerland under-21 international footballers